Campbell may refer to:

People

Surname
 Campbell (surname), includes a list of people with surname Campbell

Given name
 Campbell Brown (footballer), an Australian rules footballer
 Campbell Brown (journalist) (born 1968), American television news reporter and anchor
 Campbell Cowan Edgar (1870–1938), Scottish Egyptologist and  Secretary-General of the Egyptian Museum at Cairo 
 Campbell Jackson (born 1981), Northern Irish darts player
 Campbell Johnstone (born 1980), New Zealand rugby union player
 Campbell "Stretch" Miller (1910–1972), American sportscaster
 Campbell Money (born 1960), Scottish footballer
 Campbell Newman (born 1963), Australian politician
 Campbell Scott (born 1961), American actor, director, and voice artist

Places
In Australia:
 Campbell, Australian Capital Territory, a suburb of Canberra, Australia

In Canada:
 Campbell, Nova Scotia, on Cape Breton Island Nova Scotia
 Campbell Branch Little Black River, South of Quebec, Canada (and Maine)
 Campbell Road, Edmonton, Alberta

In Malta:
 Fort Campbell (Malta), a former fort in Mellieħa, Malta

In New Zealand:
 Campbell Islands, a sub-Antarctic group of islands in New Zealand

In South Africa:
 Campbell, Northern Cape, a town in the Northern Cape Province of South Africa

In the United States:
 Campbell, Alabama
 Campbell, California, city in Santa Clara County
 Campbell, Florida, census-designated place and an unincorporated community in Osceola County
 Campbell Branch Little Black River, North of Maine, and South of Quebec, in Canada
 Campbell, Michigan, an unincorporated community
 Campbell, Minnesota, city in Wilkin County
 Campbell, Missouri, city in Dunklin County
 Campbell, Nebraska, village in Franklin County
 Campbell, New York, town in Steuben County
 Campbell (CDP), New York, the main hamlet in the town
 Campbell, North Dakota, alternate name for Kintyre
 Campbell, Ohio, city in Mahoning County
 Campbell, Texas, city in Hunt County
 Campbell, Wisconsin, town in La Crosse County
 Campbell County (disambiguation), several counties
 Campbell Township (disambiguation), several townships
 Campbell University, a Baptist school in Buies Creek, North Carolina
 Fort Campbell, Kentucky, a large U.S. army base

Non-terrestrial
 Campbell (lunar crater)
 Campbell (Martian crater)

Other uses
 Campbell Soup Company, well-known American producer of canned soups and related products
 Campbell diagram, a plot of natural frequency versus rotor speed used to determine critical speeds in rotordynamics
 Campbell College, a school in Northern Ireland
 Campbell Saunders, fictional character in Degrassi
 Campbell Motor Car Company, a short-lived American automobile manufacturer
 Campbell Motor Industries, a vehicle assembler in New Zealand

See also
 Clan Campbell, a Scottish clan
 Clan Campbell of Cawdor, a Scottish clan (armigerous clan)
 Campbell of Craignish, a family branch of Clan Campbell
 Campbells of Strachur, a family branch of Clan Campbell
 Campbellford, Ontario, Canada
 Campbelltown (disambiguation)
 Campbellton (disambiguation)
 Campbell High School (disambiguation)
 Campbell Island (disambiguation)
 Justice Campbell (disambiguation)